John Payne may refer to:

Arts and entertainment
 J. D. Payne (born 1979/1980), American screenwriter
 John Howard Payne (1791–1852), American actor and playwright
 John Payne (actor) (1912–1989), American film actor and singer
 "Sunshine" Sonny Payne (John William Payne, 1925–2018), American radio presenter
 Johnny Payne, American dramatist, novelist, scholar, and university professor
 John Payne (voice actor) (born 1960), English-born Canadian voice actor
 John Payne (engraver) (1607–1647), English engraver
 John Payne (poet) (1842–1916), English poet and translator
 John Payne (singer) (born 1958), British singer for rock band Asia

Politics
 John Barton Payne (1855–1935), American politician, lawyer and judge, U.S. Secretary of the Interior 1920–1921
SS John Barton Payne, a Liberty ship 
 John D. Payne (born 1950), Republican member of the Pennsylvania House of Representatives

 John Otunba Payne (1839–1906), Nigerian administrator and diarist
 John Payne (New Zealand politician) (1871–1942), New Zealand politician
 John Payne (Queensland politician) (1860–1928), member of the Queensland Legislative Assembly

Religion
 John Payne (bishop of Meath) (died 1507), Irish bishop
 John Payne (martyr) (1532–1582), English Catholic priest and martyr
 John Payne (bishop of Liberia) (1815–1874), American missionary from the Episcopal Church to Africa

Sports
 John Payne (cricketer, born 1828) (1828–1887), English cricketer, father of the below
 John Payne (rugby union, born 1858) (1858–1942), English rugby union footballer and cricketer, son of the above
 John Payne (footballer, born 1889)
 John Payne (footballer, born 1906) (1906–1981), British footballer
 John Payne (American football) (1933–2019), American football coach
 John Payne (Australian footballer) (born 1950), Australian rules footballer
 John Payne (umpire) (1844–1928), Australian cricket umpire
 John Somers Payne (1926–2013), Irish Olympic sailor
 John Payne (rugby union, born 1980), Australian-born Tongan rugby union player

Other
 John Willett Payne (1752–1803), British admiral

See also 
 John Payn (disambiguation)
 John Paine (disambiguation)
 Jack Payne (disambiguation)
 John Bayne (disambiguation)